Karate competitions at the 2015 European Games in Baku were held from 13 to 14 June 2015 at the Crystal Hall complex in Baku. The competition consisted of twelve events, six in each gender - two Kata or technique events, and ten weighted kumite or combat events.

Qualification

Each National Olympic Committee will be allowed a maximum of 1 competitor per event. Each event will consist of eight competitors

Qualification will be based on the 2015 European Karate Championships between 19 and 22 March 2015 in Istanbul, Turkey; the first six finishers in each event qualify for the European Games. Hosts Azerbaijan will be awarded an entry in each event.
In addition, 12 'Universality' places will be allocated, one in each event, to ensure a spread of nations can compete.

Medalists

Men

Women

Medal table

Participating nations 

 (1)
 (2)
 (12)
 (1)
 (1)
 (1)
 (6)
 (1)
 (1)
 (1)
 (2)
 (10)
 (1)
 (5)
 (3)
 (1)
 (1)
 (1)
 (4)
 (1)
 (1)
 (1)
 (2)
 (1)
 (1)
 (1)
 (1)
 (1)
 (1)
 (2)
 (3)
 (1)
 (1)
 (7)
 (1)
 (1)
 (11)
 (3)

References

External links

 
Sports at the 2015 European Games
2015
European Games